A cover letter, covering letter, motivation letter, motivational letter, or a letter of motivation is a letter of introduction attached to or accompanying another document such as a résumé or a curriculum vitae.

For employment 
Job seekers frequently send a cover letter along with their curriculum vitae or applications for employment as a way of introducing themselves to potential employers and explaining their suitability for the desired positions. Employers may look for individualized and thoughtfully written cover letters as one method of screening out applicants who are not sufficiently interested in their positions and/or lack the necessary basic skills. 

Cover letters are typically categorized according to two purposes:

 applying for a specific, advertised opening ('letter of application')
 expressing interest in an organization when the job seeker is uncertain whether there are current openings ('letter of inquiry').

According to studies, a good cover letter should:

 be specific and up-to-date,
be well punctuated and spelled, and grammatically correct. It should be free of mistakes and typos,
 use timelines to highlight chronological information,
 reference to the latest job positions, most closely related to the position for which one is demanding,
 make the cover letter specific to the job being applied for, demonstrating some knowledge of the company and position

For internship 
Students are often asked to submit a cover letter for an internship application. Such cover letters should include examples of extracurricular and academic experiences. Despite this specific information, cover letters for internships should have a standard business letter format. 

 The , responds to a known job opening.
 The , inquires about possible positions.

Other uses 

Résumé cover letters may also serve as marketing devices for prospective job seekers. Cover letters are used in connection with many business documents such as loan applications (mortgage loan), contract drafts and proposals, and executed documents. 

Cover letters may serve the purpose of trying to catch the reader's interest or persuade the reader of something, or they may simply be an inventory or summary of the documents included along with a discussion of the expected future actions the sender or recipient will take in connection with the documents.

References

Further reading 
 

Letters (message)
Recruitment